Binwell Sinyangwe (1956-2013) was a Zambian novelist who wrote in English.

He studied industrial economics in Bucharest.

Books
Quills of Desire, Baobab Books, 1996. Republished by Heinemann (Public Policy Series), 2001
A Cowrie of Hope, Heinemann (African Writers Series), 2000

References

External links

1956 births
Living people
Zambian novelists
20th-century novelists
Date of birth missing (living people)